Karl Feldmüller (3 August 1878 – 1962) was an Austrian footballer. He played in one match for the Austria national football team in 1904.

References

External links
 

1878 births
1962 deaths
Austrian footballers
Austria international footballers
Place of birth missing
Association footballers not categorized by position